George C. Scott (October 18, 1927 – September 22, 1999) was an American actor, director, and producer who had a celebrated career on both stage and screen. Over the course of his career, he earned four Academy Award nominations, winning for Best Actor for his performance in Patton. His performances won him widespread recognition and numerous other accolades, including two Primetime Emmy Awards, two Golden Globe Awards, two British Academy Film Award nominations, two Screen Actors Guild Award nominations and five Tony Award nominations.

Major awards

Academy Awards

British Academy Film Awards

Golden Globe Awards

Primetime Emmy Awards

Screen Actors Guild Awards

Tony Awards

Miscellaneous awards

CableACE Awards

Clarence Derwent Awards

Drama Desk Awards

Fantafestival

Genie Awards

Golden Raspberry Awards

Kansas City Film Critics Circle Awards

Laurel Awards

National Board of Review Awards

National Society of Film Critics Awards

New York Film Critics Circle Awards

Obie Awards

Online Film & Television Association Awards

Outer Critics Circle Awards

Stinkers Bad Movie Awards

Theatre World Awards

Western Heritage Awards

Notes

References

Scott, George C.